The Symphonic Ellington is an album by American pianist, composer and bandleader Duke Ellington recorded and released on the Reprise label in 1963. The album features recordings of Ellington's orchestra with the Paris Symphony Orchestra, the Stockholm Symphony Orchestra, the Hamburg Symphony Orchestra, and the La Scala Symphony Orchestra.

Reception
The Allmusic review by Scott Yanow awarded the album 3 stars and stated "With most of his all-star soloists heard from in this program and a complete avoidance of trying to make his music sound so-called "respectable" or self-consciously third stream, Ellington's arrangements keep the strings from weighing down the proceedings and the music is actually quite successful".

Track listing

Recorded at Salle Wagram, Paris on January 31, 1963 (tracks 3 & 6), at Solna-Sundbyberg, Sweden on February 8, 1963 (tracks 1 & 2), at Hamburg, Germany on February 14, 1963 (track 4) and at Studio Zanibelli, Milan, Italy on February 21, 1963 (track 5).

Personnel
Duke Ellington – piano
Ray Nance - cornet
Cat Anderson, Roy Burrowes, Cootie Williams - trumpet
Lawrence Brown, Buster Cooper - trombone
Chuck Connors - bass trombone
Jimmy Hamilton - clarinet, tenor saxophone
Johnny Hodges - alto saxophone
Russell Procope - alto saxophone, clarinet
Paul Gonsalves - tenor saxophone
Harry Carney - baritone saxophone, clarinet, bass clarinet
Ernie Shepard - bass 
Sam Woodyard - drums
The Paris Symphony Orchestra (tracks 3 & 6)
The Stockholm Symphony Orchestra (tracks 1 & 2)
The Hamburg Symphony Orchestra (track 4)
The La Scala Symphony Orchestra (track 5)

References

Reprise Records albums
Duke Ellington albums
1963 albums